Ackerly may refer to:
 Ackerly, Texas
 Ackerly field, Nantucket airport
 Ackerly (surname)